Salceson is a type of meat found in Polish cuisine and other Central and Eastern European cuisines. There are several varieties of salceson which depend on the ingredients.

Varieties
 Black 'Salceson' which contains blood 
 White 'Salceson' made with a mixture of seasoned meats, without blood
 Ozorkowy (Tongue) 'Salceson' where the major meat component is tongue
 Włoski (Italian) 'Salceson' (brawn, skins, spices - garlic, pepper and caraway)
 Norweski (Norwegian) 'Salceson' (brawn, skins, broth, salmon, spices)
 Saksoński (Saxon) 'Salceson' (brawn, skins, broth, blood, offal, garlic, caraway, spices)
 Veal 'Salceson' (veal brawn and skins, broth, spices)
 Czosnkowy (Garlic) 'Salceson' (brawn, skins, broth, garlic)
 Północny (Northern) 'Salceson' (brawn, pork skin, blood, broth, garlic, liver, spices)
 Podlaski 'Salceson' (pork brawn, broth, chives, caraway, spices)

Typical ingredients: pork or veal tongues (cured), pork jowl, skins, pork liver.

The most popular type is white salceson, which can be bought from most butchers in Poland and in many grocery shops and supermarkets.

See also

 Tlačenka
 Tobă
 Aspic

References

External links
 How to prepare

Offal
Polish cuisine
Romanian cuisine
Precooked sausages